José D'Andrea (born 26 November 1915, date of death unknown) was an Argentine sabre fencer. He competed at the 1948 and 1952 Summer Olympics.

References

External links

1915 births
Year of death missing
Argentine male sabre fencers
Olympic fencers of Argentina
Fencers at the 1948 Summer Olympics
Fencers at the 1952 Summer Olympics
20th-century Argentine people